George Mason (1735 – 1806) was an English writer and book collector.

Life 
Mason was born in 1735 as the eldest son of John Mason (d. 1750), distiller, of Deptford Bridge. Later in life, having inherited ample means, he was enabled to collect some of the scarcest books in Greek, Latin, and English literature.

His main works are An Essay on Design in Gardening (1768) and A Supplement to Johnson's English Dictionary (1801).

Mason died unmarried at Aldenham Lodge, Hertfordshire on 4 Nov. 1806.

References

Further reading 
 

1735 births
1806 deaths
Alumni of the University of Oxford
English book and manuscript collectors
English writers